Miguel Giménez Igualada (1888, Iniesta, Spain – 1973, Mexico) was a Spanish individualist anarchist writer also known as Miguel Ramos Giménez and Juan de Iniesta.

Life 
In his youth, Igualada engaged in illegalist activities. He unsuccessfully proposed the creation of a Spanish Union of Egoists, and from the 1920s was a member of the anarcho-syndicalist Confederación Nacional del Trabajo. Among the many means of earning a living he was a street vendor, taxi driver, gardener, manager of a sugar plantation and rationalist teacher at the Libertarian Atheneum at Las Ventas, Madrid.

Between October 1937 and February 1938 he edited the individualist anarchist magazine Nosotros.

Igualada was strongly influenced by Max Stirner. Through his writings he promoted Stirner within Spain, and published the fourth Spanish edition of Stirner's book, The Ego and Its Own, writing its preface. In 1968 he published a treatise on Stirner, dedicated to the memory of fellow anarchist Émile Armand, and wrote and published the tract, Anarchism.

Igualada later lived in Argentina, Uruguay and Mexico, and was present at the First Congress of the Mexican Anarchist Federation in 1945.

Thought 

In his major work Anarchism Igualada states that "humanism or anarchism,...for me are the same thing". He sees the anarchist as one who "does not accept the imposition of a thought on us and who does not allows one´s own thought to be imposed over another brain, oppressing it...since anarchy is not for me a mere negation, but a twofold activity of consciousness; in the first instance a consciousness of the individual on its meaning within the human world, defending his personality against every external imposition; on a second instance, and here is present the whole great beauty of its ethic, it defends, stimulates and enhances the other´s personality.... He sees that "he who subjects his life to an exterior model cannot have any other loves which are not given by the chosen model, to which he builds an altar in his heart similar to a deity. And so even though it might preach love, it will not be loving; even it might talk about liberty, it will only conceive of a liberty conditioned by this or that which dominates it, and that liberty has every character of slavery: religion which linked his life to an external belief, which subjugates it".

Igualada exposes a radical pacifist view when he thinks that "When I say that through war humanity will never find peace, I sustain my affirmation in the fact that those who are more peaceful are the least believers, and so...one can affirm that the day of happiness in which war (religiosity is bellicosity) is extirpated from consciousness, peace will exists in the home of men, and since from consciousness these beliefs will not be extracted but only through an act of trascendental education, our labor is not of killing, but of education having it well present that to educate is not in any case domestication. And so he argues for an anarchism which will be "pacifist, poetic, which creates goodness, harmony and beauty, which cultivates a healthy sense of living in peace, sign of power and fertility...from there anyone which is un-harmonious (violent-warrior), everyone that will pretend, in any form, to dominate anyone of his similars, is not an anarchist, since the anarchist respects in such a way personal integrity, so that he could not make anyone a slave of his thoughts so as to turn him into an instrument of his, a man-tool."

Igualada´s emphasis was not on economics but his economic views could be understood in the following way. He sees "capitalism is an effect of government; the disappearance of government means capitalism falls from its pedestal vertiginously...That which we call capitalism is not something else but a product of the State, within which the only thing that is being pushed forward is profit, good or badly acquired. And so to fight against capitalism is a pointless task, since be it State capitalism or Enterprise capitalism, as long as Government exists, exploiting capital will exist. The fight, but of consciousness, is against the State.". His view on property and technocracy are as follows "¿Property? Is not a problem. Since when no one works for another, the profiteer from wealth disappears, just as government will disappear when no one pays attention to those who learned four things at universities and from that fact they pretend to govern men. Big industrial enterprises will be transformed by men in big associations in which everyone will work and enjoy the product of their work. And from those easy as well as beautiful problems anarchism deals with and he who puts them in practice and lives them are anarchists...The priority which without rest an anarchist must make is that in which no one has to exploit anyone, no man to no man, since that non-exploitation will lead to the limitation of property to individual needs".

Works 
 , 1944
 , 1946
 , 1946
 , Los caminos del hombre, 1961
 , 1968
 , Salmos, Stirner, 1968
 , 1968

See also
List of peace activists

References 

1888 births
1973 deaths
Anarcho-pacifists
Confederación Nacional del Trabajo members
Egoist anarchists
Individualist anarchists
People from the Province of Cuenca
Spanish anarchists
Spanish anti-capitalists
Spanish expatriates in Mexico